The Statute of Ireland concerning Coparceners (Latin: Statutum Hibernie de Coheredibus, or Stat. Hib. de Coher.), was an English statute made by Henry III.  It was traditionally dated from 1229, in the 14th year of his reign, but since the publication of The Statutes of the Realm it has been treated as dating from 1235 (in the 20th year of Henry III's reign).

"In that year [1229] [...] happened the great cause of Coparceners, for the decision whereof the King sent a writ, which in the printed statutes is called Statutum Hiberniæ"—Collins's Peerage of England, 1812

Although traditionally printed in collections of statutes, including in the official publication The Statutes of the Realm, the Statute of Ireland concerning Coparceners is not in the form of a statute, but rather of a letter from the King to the Justice of Ireland confirming existing English practices on inheritance.

English property law
1230s in law
13th century in England
1235 in Ireland
1235 in England